William Brian Maginess, QC (10 July 1901 – 16 April 1967), was a member of the Government of Northern Ireland, who was widely seen as a possible successor to The 1st Viscount Brookeborough as Prime Minister of Northern Ireland.

Life
He was born in 1901, the son of William George Maginess, a Lisburn solicitor, and his wife Mary Sarah Boyd. He was educated at The Wallace High School and Trinity College Dublin from where he graduated with a law degree (LLD), and was called to the Northern Ireland bar in 1923.

Having served in the Royal Corps of Artillery during the Second World War he entered the Parliament of Northern Ireland in 1938 when he won the Lisburn-centered seat of Iveagh. He entered the Cabinet of Basil Brooke in 1945 when he became Minister of Labour. His stints as the Minister of Home Affairs and Minister of Finance (de facto Deputy Prime Minister) left him favourite to succeed Brooke as Prime Minister of Northern Ireland.

In the early 1950s however, Maginess became a hate figure for the Orange Order when he banned marches through Catholic areas in Counties Down and Londonderry. Brooke demoted him to the non-Cabinet post of Attorney General in April 1956.

While Attorney General, Maginess was party to the case of Attorney General for Northern Ireland v Gallagher [1961] 3 All Er 299, which remains authority in the law of Northern Ireland and England & Wales for the principle that Dutch courage is not a defence in criminal law.  Counsel for Gallagher were future Attorney General and Lord Justice, Basil Kelly, and future Stormont MP and Chairman of the Criminal Bar Association in England, Richard Ferguson.

In December 1959, Ian Paisley led a demonstration of Ulster Protestant Action members to Stormont Castle to protest at Lord Brookeborough's refusal to dismiss Maginess and Sir Clarence Graham. They had made speeches at an Ulster Young Unionist Council event supporting Catholic membership of the Ulster Unionist Party.

Having been appointed a King's Counsel in 1946 he was appointed a County Court Judge in 1964 when he resigned from Parliament. He died three years later in Belfast's Royal Victoria Hospital at age 65. A plaque in his memorial is cited inside the Church of Ireland parish church in Hillsborough, where he is buried.

Sources

The Ulster Unionist Party, 1882–1973 : its development and organisation (1973), J F Harbinson
Paisley (1985), Moloney & Pollak
Brian Maginess and the Limits of Liberal Unionism, Irish Review, 25, 1999–2000, Henry Patterson
Ireland since 1939 (2006), Henry Patterson

1901 births
1967 deaths
Royal Artillery officers
British Army personnel of World War II
Alumni of Trinity College Dublin
Judges in Northern Ireland
Ulster Unionist Party members of the House of Commons of Northern Ireland
Members of the House of Commons of Northern Ireland 1938–1945
Members of the House of Commons of Northern Ireland 1945–1949
Members of the House of Commons of Northern Ireland 1949–1953
Members of the House of Commons of Northern Ireland 1953–1958
Members of the House of Commons of Northern Ireland 1958–1962
Members of the House of Commons of Northern Ireland 1962–1965
Northern Ireland junior government ministers (Parliament of Northern Ireland)
Members of the Privy Council of Northern Ireland
Northern Ireland Cabinet ministers (Parliament of Northern Ireland)
Attorneys General for Northern Ireland
People educated at Wallace High School, Lisburn
20th-century Irish lawyers
Ministers of Finance of Northern Ireland
Northern Ireland King's Counsel
Members of the House of Commons of Northern Ireland for County Down constituencies